Ashawawra is a Palestinian village located twelve kilometers southeast of Bethlehem. The village is in the Bethlehem Governorate central West Bank.

History

Modern era
Since the Six-Day War in 1967, Ash-Shawawra has been under Israeli occupation.

After the 1995 accords, 52.2% of Ash-Shawawra land is defined as Area A land, 6% is Area B,  14.6% is defined as Area C, while the remaining 27.2% is defined a nature reserves.

According to the Palestinian Central Bureau of Statistics, the town had a population of over 3,737 in 2007. The primary healthcare is obtained in Za'atara, where the Ministry of Health denotes the healthcare facilities as level 3.

Footnotes

External links
Al-Shawawreh, Welcome to Palestine
Ash Shawawra village (fact sheet), Applied Research Institute–Jerusalem, ARIJ
Ash Shawawra village profile, ARIJ
Ash Shawawra aerial photo, ARIJ
The priorities and needs for development in Ash Shawawra village based on the community and local authorities' assessment, ARIJ

Villages in the West Bank
Bethlehem Governorate
Municipalities of the State of Palestine